The flame-breasted sunbird (Cinnyris solaris) is a species of bird in the family Nectariniidae.
It is found on Timor and other islands, primarily in the Indonesian province of Nusa Tenggara Timur.
Its natural habitat is subtropical or tropical moist lowland forests.

References

 BirdLife International 2004.  Nectarinia solaris.   2006 IUCN Red List of Threatened Species.   Downloaded on 26 July 2007.

flame-breasted sunbird
Birds of Timor
flame-breasted sunbird
Taxonomy articles created by Polbot